The 2006 CONCACAF Beach Soccer Championship, also known as the 2006 FIFA Beach Soccer World Cup qualifiers for (CONCACAF), was the first beach soccer championship for CONCACAF, held in September 2006, in Puntarenas, Costa Rica.
The USA won the championship, with Canada finishing second. The two moved on to play in the 2006 FIFA Beach Soccer World Cup in Rio de Janeiro, Brazil from November 2 - November 12.

Competing nations

 (hosts)

Matches

Day 1

Day 2

Day 3

Day 4

Day 5

Final standings

Winners

Awards

External links
Information at CONCACAF

Beach Soccer Championship
FIFA Beach Soccer World Cup qualification (CONCACAF)
2006
2006 in beach soccer